Cats are small domesticated mammals of the Felis catus species.

Cats may also refer to:
 The cats, common name for Felidae, the biological family of the big cats, including lions, tigers, pumas, leopards and wildcats

Entertainment and media
 Cats (musical), a 1981 Andrew Lloyd Webber musical
 Cats (1998 film), a video version of the musical
 Cats (2019 film), a film based on the musical
 Cats (1925 film), a 1925 silent British comedy film 
 The Cats, Dutch rock band
 The Cats (reggae band), English reggae band
 "Cats", an episode of the television series Zoboomafoo

People
 Jacob Cats (1577–1660), Dutch poet
 Jacob Cats (painter) (1741–1799), Dutch painter

Sports
 Geelong Cats, an Australian football league team
 The former name of the Lions rugby team in South Africa
 Kilkenny GAA teams (County Kilkenny, Ireland)

Acronyms and abbreviations
CATS or C.A.T.S. may stand for:

Arts and entertainment
 Critics' Awards for Theatre in Scotland, an annual awards event in Scotland
 C.A.T.S., fictional Home Office team from C.A.T.S. Eyes, a British television series aired between 1985 and 1987
 CATS, a character from the 1989 video game Zero Wing known for speaking the phrase "All your base are belong to us"

Education
 Commonwealth Accountability Testing System, the assessment process for K-12 schools in Kentucky, United States
 Credit Accumulation and Transfer Scheme, a scheme used by many UK universities to evaluate modular degrees

Science, medicine and technology
 CATS (astronomy), Categorizing Atmospheric Technosignatures, listing related to the atmospheres of astronomical bodies.
 CATS (software), electronic design automation software
 Children's Acute Transport Service, UK Children's Intensive Care Transport Service (publicly funded)
 Cloud Aerosol Transport System, a meteorological instrument on the International Space Station
 Cognitive analytic therapy, a psychological therapy initially developed in the United Kingdom
 Computer Active Technology Suspension, an automotive technology that controls the movement of the wheels

Transport
 CATS pipeline, a natural gas pipeline in North Sea
Canadian American Transportation Systems, a defunct Fast Ferry company serving Rochester, New York and Toronto, Ontario
 Capital Area Transit System, a transit system in Baton Rouge, Louisiana
 Charlotte Area Transit System, the regional transit authority for metropolitan Charlotte, North Carolina, United States
 Chicago Area Transportation Study, the former metropolitan planning organization for the Chicago region
 Children's Acute Transport Service, UK Children's Intensive Care Transport Service (publicly funded)
 City of Anderson Transit System, a transit agency in Anderson, Indiana

Other uses
 CATS (trading system), Computer Assisted Trading System, an automated trading system developed by the Toronto Stock Exchange
Central Autónoma de Trabajadores Salvadoreños, a trade union in El Salvador
 Citizens for an Alternative Tax System, a national tax reform public interest group in the United States

See also 
 Cat (disambiguation)
 The Cats (disambiguation)
 Kats (disambiguation)
 Katz (disambiguation)